Lawana is a genus of planthoppers in the family Flatidae, erected by William Lucas Distant in 1906.  In 1923, Leopold Melichar confirmed placement of this genus in tribe Flatini and subtribe Lawanina.  Species are recorded from tropical Africa and Asia.

Species

Fulgoromorpha Lists on the Web includes:
 Lawana adscendens (Fabricius, 1803)
 Lawana arguta (Melichar, 1902)
 Lawana candida (Fabricius, 1798)  - type species (2 subsp.)
 Lawana conspersa (Walker, 1851)
 Lawana divisa (Melichar, 1902)
 Lawana exaltata (Walker, 1862)
 Lawana exsoleta Melichar, 1902
 Lawana guttifascia (Melichar, 1902) (3 subsp.)
 Lawana hyalina (Schmidt, 1904)
 Lawana imitata (Melichar, 1902)
 Lawana lineola Walker, 1870
 Lawana marginata (Walker, 1859)
 Lawana modesta Distant, 1910
 Lawana obliqua (Melichar, 1902)
 Lawana optata (Melichar, 1902) (2 subsp.)
 Lawana partita (Melichar, 1902)
 Lawana pryeri (Distant, 1880)
 Lawana pura (Schmidt, 1904)
 Lawana radiata (Distant, 1906)
 Lawana unipunctata (Schmidt, 1904)
 Lawana usambarae (Melichar, 1905)

References

External links
 
 

Flatidae
Auchenorrhyncha genera
Hemiptera of Africa
Hemiptera of Asia